Duško Dukić (born 21 June 1986) is a Serbian/Croatian football defender who plays for Jedinstvo Paraćin.

Club career

Early career
Born in Zadar, SR Croatia, SFR Yugoslavia, Dukić began his youth career already in Serbia at Jedinstvo Paraćin where plays six years . In 2001, he was for three years at Partizan's youth squad.

Jedinstvo Paraćin 
He signed his first professionally contract in 2004 for locals Jedinstvo Paraćin. The younger right-back scored one goal in his thirty appearances.

Vlasina 
He was loaned out for season 2006-2007 at FK Vlasina making eighteen appearances.

FC Vitebsk 
He signed with Vitebsk in 2007 winter just for six months time where plays four matches.

Jagodina 
This time he was loaned out to Jagodina for few months.

Albania
He played with Bylis and Korabi in Albania.

Hajduk Kula 
In this three years Dukić was at the best form in his career attract the eye of Partizan and Red Star Belgrade. However, he remain at Hajduk.

Politehnica Timișoara 
Dukić signed a contract with FC Timișoara in May 2010. He made his debut against MyPa where play forty-five minutes. He terminated his contract on 19 January 2011.

Second spell with Jagodina 
During the winter break of the 2010–11 season, he returned to Serbia and signed with top-league side FK Jagodina.

Panargiakos
In summer 2017 he signed with Greek side Panargiakos.

Paraćin
In summer 2018 he returned to Serbia and played first one season with Borac Paraćin in Serbian League East and then moved to city rivals Jedinstvo Paraćin.

Honours
Jagodina
Serbian Cup: 2013

References

External links
 
 Duško Dukić at Utakmica.rs 
 
 

1986 births
Living people
Sportspeople from Zadar
Serbs of Croatia
Association football fullbacks
Croatian footballers
Serbian footballers
FK Vlasina players
FC Vitebsk players
FK Jagodina players
FK Hajduk Kula players
FC Politehnica Timișoara players
FK Voždovac players
FK Spartak Subotica players
FC Alashkert players
KF Bylis Ballsh players
KF Korabi Peshkopi players
Panargiakos F.C. players
Belarusian Premier League players
Serbian SuperLiga players
Armenian Premier League players
Kategoria Superiore players
Serbian First League players
Serbian expatriate footballers
Expatriate footballers in Belarus
Serbian expatriate sportspeople in Belarus
Expatriate footballers in Romania
Serbian expatriate sportspeople in Romania
Expatriate footballers in Armenia
Serbian expatriate sportspeople in Armenia
Expatriate footballers in Albania
Serbian expatriate sportspeople in Albania
Expatriate footballers in Greece
Serbian expatriate sportspeople in Greece